The Penal Code of Bangladesh is the official criminal code of Bangladesh. It is a comprehensive code designed to govern all areas of criminal law. The code is largely derived from the  penal code of the British Indian Empire enacted in 1860 by the Governor General-in-Council of the Bengal Presidency. It is similar to the penal codes of countries formerly part of the British Empire in South and Southeast Asia, including Singapore, India, Pakistan, Sri Lanka and Malaysia. 

The Jatiya Sangsad has amended the penal code on several occasions, with the most recent being in 2004.

The code is a legacy of the Victorian era. While its objective is to provide a general penal code for Bangladesh, other criminal law statutes have also been enacted by the Bangladeshi parliament.

History
The code was drafted on the recommendations of first law commission of British India. It was presented to the Governor of Bengal in 1837. While based on the law of Victorian England, it derived elements from the Napoleonic Code and Louisiana Civil Code of 1825. It was adopted on 6 October 1860. When East Bengal became part of Pakistan after the Partition of British India, the code was known as the Pakistan Penal Code. The code was re-enacted in Bangladesh after the country's independence in 1971.

Chapters
The following includes the chapters of the code.

Chapter I - Introduction
Chapter II - General Explanations
Chapter III - Punishments
Chapter IV - General Exceptions
Chapter V - Abetment
Chapter VA - Criminal Conspiracy
Chapter VI - Offences Against the State
Chapter VII - Offences relating to the Army, Navy or Air Force
Chapter VIII - Offences Against Public Tranquility
Chapter IX - Offences by or relating to Public Servants
Chapter IXA - Offences relating to Elections
Chapter X - Contempts of the Lawful Authority of Public Servants 
Chapter XI - False Evidence and Offences Against Public Justice
Chapter XII - Offences relating to Coin and Government Stamps
Chapter XIII - Offences relating to Weights and Measures
Chapter XIV - Offences Affecting the Public Health, Safety, Convenience, Decency and Morals
Chapter XV - Offences relating to Religion
Chapter XVI - Offences affecting the Human Body
Chapter XVII - Offences against Property
Chapter XVIII - Offences relating to Documents and Trade or Property Marks
Chapter XIX - Criminal Breach of Contracts of Service
Chapter XX - Offences relating to Marriage
Chapter XXI - Defamation
Chapter XXII - Criminal Intimidation, Insult, Prejudicial Act and Annoyance
Chapter XXIII - Attempts to Commit Offences

Controversial issues

Sedition
Sedition and seditious libel has been criticized as an outdated law. While the United Kingdom has phased out penalties for seditious libel, its continued presence in the Bangladeshi penal code has been used by the government to target to leading journalists and politicians.

Section 377
Section 377 criminalizes homosexuality, which has been criticized by the LGBT rights movement.

Capital punishment

Capital punishment remains legal in Bangladesh, although other common law countries like the United Kingdom and Canada have abolished the death penalty.

See also
Law of Bangladesh

References

Law of Bangladesh
Criminal codes